Cloricromen is a platelet aggregation inhibitor.

References

Antiplatelet drugs
Coumarin drugs
Chloroarenes
Diethylamino compounds